Seán Egan (born 18 October 1956) is an Irish athlete. He competed in the men's hammer throw at the 1980 Summer Olympics.

References

1956 births
Living people
Athletes (track and field) at the 1980 Summer Olympics
Irish male hammer throwers
Olympic athletes of Ireland
Place of birth missing (living people)